Night Ride is a 1937 black and white British drama film directed by John Paddy Carstairs and starring Julian Vedey, Wally Patch and Jimmy Hanley. It was made at Pinewood Studios as a quota quickie for release by Paramount Pictures. The film's sets were designed by the art director Wilfred Arnold.

Plot
Young truck driver Dick Benson (Jimmy Hanley) and friend Alf Higgins (Wally Patch) set up their own haulage company with the financial backing of Tony Spinelli (Julian Vedey), an Italian restaurant owner. However, their former boss Arthur Wilson (Frank Petley), concerned about the competition, uses underhand methods to try and sabotage the enterprise. Wilson sends his attractive daughter Ruth (Elizabeth Kent) to seduce Dick, and a group of thugs to work over their trucks. Wilson very nearly succeeds, but Dick and the truckers make a success of themselves by rescuing miners trapped in a flooded mine.

Main cast
 Julian Vedey as Tony Spinelli  
 Wally Patch as Alf Higgins  
 Jimmy Hanley as Dick Benson  
 Joan Ponsford as Jean Morley  
 Frank Petley as Arthur Wilson  
 Elizabeth Kent as Ruth Wilson  
 Kenneth Buckley as Claude Dulson  
 Clelia Matania as Lucia Spinelli  
 Moore Marriott as Miner (role cut)

References

Bibliography
 Low, Rachael. Filmmaking in 1930s Britain. George Allen & Unwin, 1985.
 Wood, Linda. British Films, 1927-1939. British Film Institute, 1986.

External links

1937 films
British drama films
1937 drama films
Films shot at Pinewood Studios
Films directed by John Paddy Carstairs
Films set in England
Quota quickies
British and Dominions Studios films
British black-and-white films
1930s English-language films
1930s British films
English-language drama films